Jack Petocz (born September 8, 2004) is an American student activist, the founder and director of Recall FCSB, and a political strategist for the nonprofit organization Gen-Z for Change. He identifies as gay and speaks openly about his experiences as an LGBTQ+ person. As an activist, he has protested publicly in opposition of public-school policing in the state of Florida related to discriminatory book bans, dress code policies, and Parental Rights in Education legislation which he believes further marginalize minorities. His writing about LGBTQ+ rights have been featured in many publications including FlaglerLive, The New York Times, and MSNBC.

Early life 
Petocz attended Rymfire Elementary School, Indian Trails Middle School, and Flagler Palm Coast High School.

Activism

Equitable Dress Code for Students 
On August 23, 2021, in an op-ed with Flagler Live, Petocz voiced his opinion on the school district’s dress code policy and brought attention to a petition to have it changed. He stated that the dress code stripped students of all individuality and expression adding that female students were particularly adversely affected.

Opposition of State Governed Book Bans 
In November 2021, Petocz organized a protest challenging the Flagler County School Board for a book ban which called to remove books about LGBTQ+ characters and racism in the classroom.

Petocz, the only student in recent memory that a school board member censored as he was addressing the board, mobilized a protest after Board member Jill Woolbright filed a challenge to four titles in school libraries. The challenge caused the titles to be removed from circulation. Woolbright in a criminal complaint filed with the Flagler County Sheriff’s Office and later in statements at school board meetings declared one of the circulation titles as criminal because of its sexual themes. Woolbright was supported by Board member Janet McDonald (the board member who’d censored Petocz), who used similar language to describe some of the books in question, especially George Johnson All Boys Aren’t Blue, a memoir of growing up Black and queer.

Petocz was featured in The New York Times for organizing the protest against the Flagler County School Board for banning Johnson’s book from school libraries. In the article, Petocz said that as a gay student himself, books like All Boys Aren't Blue are critical for youth. He highlighted that it felt discriminatory against the LGBTQ+ community and books that don't have his community's representation are rarely challenged.

In an MSNBC interview, Petocz stated that the LGBTQ+ communities are further marginalized by school boards that police education, and the efforts to remove these books from the classroom is an attempt to erase identities as a whole.

Launching Recall FCSB 
After being silenced at meetings, Petocz founded Recall FCSB. The group is a student-led organization working toward empowering youth to act and vote against bigotry which they believe to be rampant within the Flagler County School Board. Its social media accounts were created on November 11, 2021.

Organizing a Student Walk-Out in Protest of “Don’t Say Gay Bill” 
On March 3, 2022, at age 17, Petocz planned a pre-approved rally and “Say Gay” walk-out at Flagler Palm Coast High School in opposition of the “Don’t Say Gay Bill.” Over 500 of the school’s students attended the protest as well as thousands of others statewide. The law, HB 1557, officially entitled “Parental Rights in Education,” prohibits discussion of gender identity and sexual orientation in public classrooms in kindergarten through third grade and only when age-appropriate in higher grades.

Petocz obtained administrative permission to host the walk-out but was later suspended for his actions as leader of the rally when he distributed gay pride flags which violated the school's code of conduct. A change.org petition to overturn Petocz’s administrative removal resulted in over 7,000 signatures when Principal Greg Schwartz elected to rescind the suspension.

Petocz soon after wrote a letter to Governor Ron DeSantis in response to the bill's progression, requesting a meeting to discuss the potential impact of the GOP legislation and agenda.

Joining Forces with Other Young Activists 
Petocz is also a strategist associate for Gen-Z for Change, a coalition of more than 500 creators and activists fighting for progressive change to promote civil discourse and political action among the generation.

Personal life 
Petocz is openly gay. He is an active participant at PEN America's Free Speech Advocacy institute. He is a May 2022 Recipient of the PEN America/Benenson Freedom of Expression Courage Award.

References 

American child activists
American LGBT rights activists
LGBT people from Florida
American political consultants
Living people
Place of birth missing (living people)
21st-century American LGBT people
American gay men
Activists from Florida
2004 births